The Tamron 28-300mm F/3.5-6.3 Di VC PZD is an interchangeable superzoom camera lens announced by Tamron on February 6, 2014.

References

https://www.dpreview.com/products/tamron/lenses/tamron_28-300_3p5-6p3_di_vc_pzd

Superzoom lenses
28-300
Camera lenses introduced in 2014